"Superfly Guy" is a song by British dance music act S'Express, released as the second single from their debut album, Original Soundtrack (1988). The song was a hit on the charts in Europe and reached number five on the UK singles charts in August 1988.

Critical reception
James Hamilton from Record Mirror wrote in his dance column, "Chugging and thumping -0bpm percussive jiggly thudder with chanting girls, wailing guys, dialogue samples and various breaks, quite bright but monotonous and less catchy than their number one."

Charts

References

External links
 "Superfly Guy" at AllMusic.com
 "Superfly Guy" at Discogs.com

1988 songs
1988 singles
S'Express songs
UK Independent Singles Chart number-one singles
Song articles with missing songwriters